Face ( Liǎn) is a 2009 Taiwanese-French film written and directed by Tsai Ming-liang.

Plot
Hsiao-Kang, a Taiwanese filmmaker, travels to France to shoot a film in the Louvre. As he is not fluent in French, the director encounters some difficulties. Then, he learns that his mother has died.

Cast
 Fanny Ardant - The producer / Queen Herodias
 Laetitia Casta - The star / Salomé
 Jean-Pierre Léaud - Antoine / King Herode
 Lee Kang-sheng - Hsiao-Kang, the director
 Lu Yi-ching - Hsiao-Kang's mother
 Mathieu Amalric - Man in the bushes
 Nathalie Baye
 Samuel Ganes
 Olivier Martinaud
 Jeanne Moreau
 François Rimbau
 Norman Atun
 Chen Shiang-chyi
 Chen Chao-jung

Background
Face was written and directed by Tsai Ming-liang. It is set in the Louvre, as the museum had invited Tsai to make a film there. The Louvre contributed 775,000 euros, which was around 20 percent of the entire budget. The film is also inspired by director François Truffaut, and the cast includes several actors who worked with Truffaut.

Face was described as a "meditation on the cinematic process." Like Tsai's other films, Face is about people who are incredibly alienated.

Reception
Face has a 60% rating on Rotten Tomatoes. It was nominated for the Golden Palm at the 2009 Cannes Film Festival. According to Eric Kohn of Indiewire, the film's story is "a bit difficult to follow". He added that "on a visual level, however, it's undoubtedly the prettiest movie in the festival's main competition."

References

External links
 

2009 films
2000s musical comedy films
2009 multilingual films
Chinese-language films
Films directed by Tsai Ming-liang
2000s French-language films
Taiwanese musical comedy films
Taiwanese multilingual films
Films with screenplays by Tsai Ming-liang
French musical comedy films
French multilingual films
Films set in Paris
2009 comedy films
2000s French films